There is such a party! is a catch phrase allegedly uttered by Vladimir Lenin on June 17, 1917 at the First All–Russian Congress of Soviets in response to the thesis of the Minister of the Provisional Government Irakli Tsereteli.

History

Preceding events
After the February Revolution, the leaders of the Socialist Mensheviks Fedor Dan, Mikhail Lieber, Irakli Tsereteli and Nikolay Chkheidze were members of the Petrograd Soviet and in this capacity advocated active cooperation between the Soviet and the Provisional Government. Having occupied some of the ministerial posts, the socialists actively implemented elements of their political program. Thus, the Minister of Agriculture, Socialist Revolutionary Viktor Chernov, legalized the right of peasants to uncultivated land, despite the protests of the landowners; Social Democrat Labor Minister Matvey Skobelev introduced compulsory health insurance for industrial workers, the right of trade unions to resolve labor disputes in court, and other measures that significantly alleviated the situation of workers. For Lenin, any form of cooperation with the government was a betrayal of the revolution.

Meanwhile, the situation in the country continued to deteriorate steadily: desertions were gaining momentum in the army; in the countryside, chaos and lawlessness reigned, accompanied by self–seizure of land and the destruction of property of landowners. The most important question of ending the war remained unresolved. The interim government lost control over the regions: local councils behaved as if they were government bodies. In this situation, the First All–Russian Congress of Soviets was convened in Petrograd.

Congress of Soviets
The First All–Russian Congress of Soviets was held from June 16 to July 7, 1917. It was attended by over a thousand deputies, of whom 822 had the right to vote. The Bolshevik delegation had 105 seats at the Congress, significantly inferior to both the Socialist Revolutionaries (285 seats) and the Mensheviks (248 seats).

On the first day of the Congress, June 3, in the speech of the Chairman of the Petrograd Soviet, Irakli Tsereteli, the question was raised: can any of the delegates name a party that would risk taking power into its own hands and taking responsibility for everything that happens in Russia. Lenin, who was present in the hall, remained silent and did not interrupt the speaker. The next day, June 4, Lenin was given the floor for a 15-minute speech, in which the word "is!" (without the words "such a party"), as well as a reference to the speech of Irakli Tsereteli on the previous day of the Congress. Lenin said, literally, the following:

According to Robert Service, Lenin's words drew thunderous applause among the Bolsheviks, but the overwhelming majority of the congress participants did not take them seriously, there was a laugh in the hall (in the above transcript there is "laughter, applause" after Lenin's words).

Lenin himself mentioned this in his later work of the same year, "Will the Bolsheviks Retain State Power?" so: "... Will the Bolsheviks dare to take the entire state power into their own hands? I already had a chance at the All–Russian Congress of Soviets to answer with a categorical statement to this question in one remark that I happened to shout from my seat during one of Tsereteli's ministerial speeches".

In Soviet Union

The authors of the memoirs published in the Soviet Union claimed that the phrase "There is such a party!" sounded like a replica from a place at the time of Tsereteli's speech, and this phrase "shocked the audience", "sounded like a thunderclap" and the like.

Cultural significance
In the Soviet Union, the phrase was widely known: it was quoted in history textbooks, speeches, literature, drama and other works of Soviet official art. Some of these works continue to be performed in the post–Soviet period. For example, the song «There is Such a Party!» from the repertoire of the Song and Dance Ensemble of the Russian Army:

In post–Soviet times, the expression is usually used in a figurative sense, not associated with Lenin, the Bolsheviks and politics in general; it is used to figuratively emphasize the existence, presence of an object or phenomenon, as well as in various jokes and anecdotes:
In the film «The Weather is Good on Deribasovskaya, or It is Raining Again on Brighton Beach», the leader of the mafia Actor, disguised as Lenin, says:

Mikhail Savelichev. "Tiger, Light Burning Tiger!":

Notes

References

Sources

Central Archive. First All–Russian Congress of Soviets of Workers' and Soldiers' Deputies. Volume I – Moscow: State Publishing House, 1930
Victor Chernov. Lenin // "People's Cause". No. 26, April 16, 1917

External links
Article by Dmitry Olshansky on Apn.Ru
Article by Margarita Samokhina on the Site Old.Russ.Ru
Listen to the Song "There is Such a Party!" Performed by the Alexandrov Ensemble

Propaganda in the Soviet Union
June 1917 events
Russian Revolution